Thegodmachine is the debut studio album by American metalcore band Phinehas. The band was signed to the independent Christian metal label, Red Cord Records, shortly after the album's production was finished. The album was physically released on July 19, 2011, and was later digitally released on September 30, 2011. It was produced by the band themselves and Jeff Darcy.

Promotion and release
The album received a physical release on July 19, 2011 and later a digital release on September 30. A music video was released for the song "I Am the Lion" on December 6. The video was directed by Josiah Bultima under the Red Epic moniker. "Crowns" was released as the second video from the album on April 17, 2012. The music video was directed by John Mediana. The third and final music video released from the album was "My Horses Are Many"; the video was released on October 19 and was directed by the band. The video shows the band at a mini-golf course in Wichita Falls, Texas on a day off from touring.

Acoustic versions of "A Pattern in Pain", "Crowns" and "The Wishing Well" were released on the EP The Bridge Between.

Track listing

Personnel
Credits adapted from AllMusic.

Phinehas
 Sean McCulloch – lead vocals, additional guitars
 Jason Combs – lead guitar, engineering
 Dustin Saunders – rhythm guitar
 Scott Whelan – rhythm guitar, backing vocals (left during production)
 Ryan Estrada – bass
 Lee Humerian – drums, backing vocals, additional guitars

Additional musicians
 Thomas Cho – additional guitars and vocals
 Bryce Adkins – additional vocals
 Mike Ruffino – additional vocals

Additional personnel
 Jeff Darcy – engineering, mixing, mastering, additional guitars and vocals, production
 Phinehas – production
 Mitchell Levine – management
 Trent Tieso – artwork, direction

References

2011 debut albums
Phinehas (band) albums